Yu Jishi (1 May 1904 – 25 January 1990) was a Chinese Nationalist military general from Fenghua, Zhejiang. He served with distinction during the Battle of Shanghai and was wounded leading a defense in battle. After the war, he retreated to Taiwan along with the Nationalist government and served with the defence ministry.

National Revolutionary Army generals from Zhejiang
1904 births
1990 deaths
Politicians from Ningbo
Kuomintang politicians in Taiwan
Republic of China politicians from Zhejiang
Taiwanese people from Zhejiang